This article details the qualifying phase for modern pentathlon at the 2024 Summer Olympics. Thirty-six athletes for each gender must qualify for the Games, with only a maximum of two each per NOC. Qualification methods are similarly applied to both men's and women's events.

Host nation France has been guaranteed one quota place automatically, while two invitational positions are distributed by the UIPM once the rest of the qualifiers are announced and thereby decided.

One place will be handily awarded to the winner of the 2019 UIPM World Cup final. Twenty places are determined by the continental championships: one each from Africa and Oceania, five from Asia, eight from Europe, and five from the Americas with a maximum of one quota per NOC (two winners each from NORCECA and South America, and the highest-ranked from the 2023 Pan American Games).

Three places have been reserved for the highest-ranked modern pentathletes at the 2023 and 2024 UIPM World Championships, respectively. The remaining six will be awarded based on the UIPM World Rankings of June 17, 2024, unless a reallocation of unused berths has been invoked before the deadline.

Qualification summary

Men's events

Women's events

References

Qualification
Qualification for the 2024 Summer Olympics